Trälhavets Båtklubb (TBK) is one of the biggest local yacht clubs in Sweden. It is situated in Österåker, just outside Stockholm, right in the middle the Trälhavet Bay. 

TBK runs sailing schools for young sailors, arranging dinghy races and has large facilities for more than six hundred yachts.

It is run in a "club" form. That is, members do the necessary work on their boats. The work is organised by a committee and supervised by a harbour master. In wintertime yachts are kept ashore and the work to take boats up and launching them is also carried out by members. Each member takes care of her/his own yacht as far as autumn and spring chores are concerned.

External links

 Trälhavets Båtklubb website

Yacht clubs in Sweden
Sport in Stockholm